The Indian cricket team is scheduled to tour Ireland in August 2023 to play three Twenty20 International (T20I) matches. In the month of March, the dates of first and last T20I were also confirmed along with the venue. All the matches will be played in Malahide.

References

2023 in Irish cricket
International cricket competitions in 2023
2023 in Indian cricket